Cheng Chi-hung (born 20 June 1985 in Kaohsiung City, Taiwan), is a Taiwanese professional baseball pitcher for Chinatrust Brothers of Chinese Professional Baseball League (CPBL).

Career
Cheng began his career in 2004 with the Pulaski Blue Jays, the Class-A affiliate of the Toronto Blue Jays.

In 2008, he played for the Lansing Lugnuts.

On January 4, 2009 Cheng signed a Minor League Contract with the Pittsburgh Pirates. On August 10, 2009 Cheng was released by the Pirates.

International career
Cheng also plays for the Chinese Taipei national baseball team at the 2009 World Baseball Classic.

External links
, or CPBL

1985 births
Living people
Auburn Doubledays players
Baseball pitchers
Brother Elephants players
CTBC Brothers players
Gulf Coast Blue Jays players
Lansing Lugnuts players
Lynchburg Hillcats players
Pulaski Blue Jays players
Baseball players from Kaohsiung
Taiwanese expatriate baseball players in the United States
2009 World Baseball Classic players